Kamao is a 1987 Filipino made-for-television action film directed by Celso Ad. Castillo and starring Fernando Poe Jr., Castillo, Mary Walter, and Rachel Ann Wolfe. Produced as the first television film for the Artista anthology program on Radio Philippines Network (RPN), it is about a boxer-turned-barangay captain who has to deal with a gang of drug dealers. The film first aired on RPN in the Philippines on June 11, 1987.

Cast
Fernando Poe Jr.
Celso Ad. Castillo
Mary Walter
Rachel Ann Wolfe

Release
Kamao originally aired on RPN in the Philippines on June 11, 1987, as the first installment of the Artista anthology program.

Critical response
Art Dialogo of the Manila Standard gave Kamao a positive, albeit cynical, review. While he considered Fernando Poe Jr. as "not a letdown" and Celso Ad. Castillo to be "believable", he gave special praise to Rachel Ann Wolfe's performance as the drug-addled sister of Poe's character, stating that she "lent freshness to what could have been another washed out production.

References

External links

1987 television films
1987 films
1987 action films
Filipino-language films
Films about drugs
Philippine action films
Philippine television films
Radio Philippines Network original programming
Films directed by Celso Ad. Castillo